Agaraea is a genus of tiger moths in the family Erebidae. The genus was erected by Gottlieb August Wilhelm Herrich-Schäffer in 1855.

Species

Agaraea atrivena Dognin, 1911
Agaraea boettgeri Rothschild, 1909
Agaraea citrinotincta Rothschild, 1909
Agaraea emendatus (H. Edwards, 1884)
Agaraea insconspicua Schaus, 1910
Agaraea internervosa (Dognin, 1912)
Agaraea klagesi Rothschild, 1909
Agaraea longicornis Herrich-Schäffer, [1855]
Agaraea minuta (Schaus, 1892)
Agaraea mossi Rothschild, 1922
Agaraea nigrostriata Rothschild, 1909
Agaraea nigrotuberata Bryk, 1953
Agaraea ockendeni Rothschild, 1909
Agaraea phaeophlebia Hampson, 1920
Agaraea rulla Schaus, 1920
Agaraea santaris Schaus, 1920
Agaraea schausi Rothschild, 1909
Agaraea semivitrea Rothschild, 1909
Agaraea sorex (Druce, 1902)
Agaraea strigata (Reich, 1936)
Agaraea uniformis (Hampson, 1898)

References

Phaegopterina
Moth genera